Heshtia is a village in Ninotsminda (formerly Bogdanovsky) region of Georgia not far from Abul mountain. It is mainly populated by Armenian-Catholics.

See also
 Samtskhe-Javakheti

Populated places in Samtskhe–Javakheti